Serena Solitaire Crichton-Stuart, Marchioness of Bute (born 29 December 1959), also known by her maiden name Serena Wendell, is a British fashion designer and former model.

Life
Born in December 1959, Bute is the daughter of Major Jack Wendell (1924–2005) and his wife Anthea Peronelle Maxwell-Hyslop, and a niece of Robin Maxwell-Hyslop.
She was brought up in London and rural Wales by her mother and stepfather, Peter Rees, Baron Rees, and became a fashion model.

She married firstly Robert de Lisser, and they had two children, including Jazzy de Lisser. Secondly, on 13 February 1999, in the marble chapel at Mount Stuart House, on the island of Bute, she married as his second wife John Crichton-Stuart, 7th Marquess of Bute, with whom she has a daughter. Until his death in March 2021, they shared a house in Regent's Park and also had Mount Stuart House, but did not live there, preferring a renovated farmhouse, Ardscalpsie, six miles from Rothesay on the west coast of Bute.

Bute is a director of Rowanwood Ltd, Deltawood Ltd, and Serena Bute Ltd.

Label
The guiding principle of the Serena Bute label is "elegant comfort". Bute's collections include wide-legged trousers, always with a grosgrain stripe. Shirts are large and tailored, made of silk, velvet, and cotton. Woollen cloths and wool-silk fabrics are supplied by Bute Fabrics, a long-established upholstery firm founded by her late husband's grandfather the 5th Marquess of Bute.

The label is reported as a favourite of Kate Moss, Emma Watson, Rita Ora, and Adwoa Aboah.

Notes

1959 births
English fashion designers
Scottish marchionesses
Living people